Nizamuddin Fakhrul Mulk was an Islamic nobleman of the 11th and 12th century.

His court included the algebra scholar Abu Bakr Karaji.

Following the 1015 death of poet and ruler Sayyid Radi, Mulk was tasked with bringing his brother Sayyid Murtada back home.

He was the recipient of at least five letters from the Sufi scholar al-Ghazali.

References

Muslim monarchs